South Korean rapper, songwriter and record producer RM (formerly Rap Monster) is best known as the leader of South Korean boy band BTS. He has written and composed much of the band's output since their debut in 2013, often alongside bandmates J-Hope and Suga. As a solo artist, he has written and released two mixtapes, RM (2015) and Mono (2018), and one studio album, "Indigo" (2022). With 200 songs attributed to his name as a songwriter and composer by the Korea Music Copyright Association (KOMCA), as of September 2022, RM is the youngest and second most-credited songwriter in the association's history. His credits include solos for his BTS bandmates, music for his various features, and two songs for former Big Hit Entertainment labelmate Glam prior to their disbandment. In December 2020, RM made his debut on the Billboard Hot 100 Songwriters Chart at number three, after six songs that he co-wrote on BTS' fifth Korean-language studio album Be concurrently charted on the Billboard Hot 100.

Songs

2010–2013

2014

2015

2016

2017

2018

2019

2020

2021

2022

Notes

References

 
RM